Kaloyan "Kay" Kalinov Kostadinov (born 18 July 2002) is a Norwegian football midfielder who plays for Stabæk.

Career
Coming through the youth system of Sandnes Ulf, he made his senior debut in the 2019 Norwegian Football Cup against Vard. He made his league debut in July 2019 against Notodden. This year he also made his debut for a Norwegian youth national team. At the end of the 2019–20 winter transfer window he agreed to a transfer to first-tier Stabæk. Albeit the transfer would happen in August 2020, he did not play any Sandnes Ulf games in 2020 and instead made his Stabæk debut in September 2020 against Odd.

International career
Kostadinov was born in Norway to Bulgarian parents, which makes him eligible for both Norway and Bulgaria national teams. He represented U17 and U18 teams of Norway.

References

2002 births
Living people
People from Sandnes
Norwegian people of Bulgarian descent
Norwegian footballers
Sandnes Ulf players
Stabæk Fotball players
Norwegian First Division players
Eliteserien players
Association football midfielders
Norway youth international footballers
Sportspeople from Rogaland